The Buffalo Club was an American country music group from Nashville, Tennessee. The group was composed of Ron Hemby (lead vocals, guitar), John Dittrich (vocals, drums), and Charlie Kelley (vocals, guitar). Hemby was a vocalist in the Christian group The Imperials, Kelley played guitar for Doug Stone, and Dittrich had left his role as the drummer in the band Restless Heart. The Buffalo Club released a self-titled album on the Rising Tide Records label in 1997 and charted three singles on the Billboard Hot Country Songs charts that year, including "If She Don't Love You" at number nine. The album received generally positive reviews for the band's use of vocal harmony, with many critics comparing their sound favorably to the Eagles. Dittrich quit in August 1997, with Hemby and Kelley briefly continuing as a duo before disbanding by year's end. Afterward, Dittrich rejoined Restless Heart while Kelley and Hemby started other projects.

History
The Buffalo Club was founded in 1996 in Nashville, Tennessee by John Dittrich, best known as the drummer for the country music band Restless Heart. Dittrich met vocalist Ron Hemby, a touring vocalist for the contemporary Christian music group The Imperials, in the mid-1990s. After Restless Heart disbanded in 1994, Dittrich expressed interest in forming a musical act where he could express more creative control than he got to in his former band. As he thought that he was not suitable to work as a solo artist, Dittrich thus decided to form a new band with Hemby. The two then recruited guitarist Charlie Kelley, who had previously been a backing musician for Charly McClain and Doug Stone. Hemby assumed the role of lead vocalist. Both Kelley and Dittrich served as harmony vocalists, also contributing on guitar and drums respectively. Working with Dan Goodman as their manager, the three musicians recorded a demo which was sent to Ken Levitan, then president of Rising Tide Records. The label's Nashville division, dedicated to country music, signed the band soon after. Hemby and Dittrich said their main influence was the country rock of the 1970s, such as the Eagles, particularly in the use of vocal harmony and acoustic guitar. Kelley thought that the band's sound would be appealing to radio as they intended to use fewer instruments on the songs than were normal at the time. Hemby thought that the band's sound would have "more aggressive harmony".

Initially, the group was to be called Johnny Ringo, but was renamed The Buffalo Club as representatives of Rising Tide disliked the original name. The name was inspired by the town of Buffalo, Wyoming. The Buffalo Club began performing together in November 1996. After signing, the band began recording songs with producer Barry Beckett. Dittrich had previously worked with Beckett on a movie soundtrack to which Restless Heart had contributed, and chose him to be The Buffalo Club's producer because he "admired" Beckett's production style. Additionally, Hemby noted that Beckett was less controlling than other producers with whom he had worked previously. At this point, the band promoted themselves with impromptu acoustic performances in the offices of Nashville record executives.

Self-titled album
Rising Tide Records selected "If She Don't Love You" as the band's first single. Upon its release to country radio in early 1997, the track reached number nine on the Billboard Hot Country Songs chart. This song had been previously offered to Restless Heart, who declined it. The song's co-writers were Trey Bruce and Marc Beeson, the latter of whom  recording on Curb Records as a member of Burnin' Daylight. Joel Hoffner, then the vice president of sales and marketing for Rising Tide Records, came up with two unusual methods to promote the band. First, he sent packages containing plastic buffalo in them, with no return address, to various industry executives before sending those same executives a promotional card for the band one week later. Hoffner observed that the plastic buffalo became a topic of conversation among said executives. In addition, the compact disc single release of "If She Don't Love You" featured the song on it 20 times so that the song would continue playing if listeners neglected to turn off their players.

The Buffalo Club's self-titled debut album was released on March 25, 1997. Beckett produced the album and played keyboards on it, with other contributing musicians including Eddie Bayers and Michael Rhodes. Dittrich co-wrote the track "The Funny Thing Is", and Hemby co-wrote "Wish for You". An uncredited review of the album in Billboard compared the band's sound favorably to that of the Eagles while also praising the songwriting. Gordon Ely of the Richmond Times-Dispatch also reviewed the album with favor, drawing comparisons to the Eagles, Restless Heart, and Crosby, Stills & Nash. His review was favorable toward the album's songwriting and the trio's vocal harmony. Robert Loy of Country Standard Time gave a more mixed review, stating that "the harmonies are above average, and Ron Hemby's vocals deserve better material than anything here". In mid-1997, the band supported the album by touring alongside Sherrié Austin as opening acts for Tracy Lawrence. They also performed several shows at Toolies, a former nightclub in Phoenix, Arizona.

Following "If She Don't Love You" was "Nothin' Less Than Love", which was co-written by Rusty Young of Poco and originally recorded by Bryan White on his 1994 self-titled debut album. The Buffalo Club's rendition peaked at number 26 on Hot Country Songs by the middle of the year. Dittrich left the band in August 1997, stating in a letter of resignation, "I am no longer able to continue to do the things deemed necessary to break a new artist in this format". At the time of his resignation, Hemby and Kelley announced their intent to continue as a duo. The Buffalo Club then released their third and final single "Heart Hold On". Co-written by Blackhawk lead singer Henry Paul, this song peaked at number 53 on the country music charts. The song's corresponding music video was the directorial debut of Trey Fanjoy, who went on to direct a number of country music videos in the late 1990s and into the 21st century.

Disbanding
Hemby and Kelley disbanded in December 1997. In addition, Rising Tide Records closed in March 1998, with The Buffalo Club representing the label's only success at country radio. At the time of their disbanding, Rising Tide executive Ken Levitan stated that Dittrich's announcement that he would rejoin Restless Heart on a reunion tour in 1998 created disputes between the two of them and was a factor in Dittrich's departure. In addition, Hemby and Kelley were unable to continue as a duo because Hemby wanted to be the sole lead singer, whereas Kelley wanted the two to alternate on lead vocals. Dittrich rejoined Restless Heart in 1998 as part of the reunion tour, and has remained with them since. By 2013, Kelley founded the polka duo The Boxhounds with Lynn Marie. Hemby went on to become a touring musician for David Kersh before becoming a worship leader at a church in Franklin, Tennessee, in addition to founding an Eagles tribute band called the Eaglemaniacs.

Discography

Studio albums

Singles

Music videos

References

Country music groups from Tennessee
Musical groups established in 1996
Musical groups disestablished in 1997
Vocal trios
Rising Tide Records artists
Restless Heart